James Francis Ryan (April 21, 1936 – August 31, 2022) was an American screenwriter in the DePatie–Freleng Enterprises, also the Filmation studios and Hanna–Barbera. As Jim Ryan he wrote the screen story from the 1987 ITC Entertainment Group film The Brave Little Toaster.

Career
Ryan began his career at DePatie-Freleng Enterprises, where he penned episodes of The Inspector and scripted the Pink Panther short Psychedelic Pink. At Filmation, he wrote for several cartoons alongside writing partner Bill Danch, including Mission: Magic! (starring Rick Springfield), Shazam!, one of Ryan's few forays into live action, and Fabulous Funnies. Ryan and Danch were head writers of The Secret Lives of Waldo Kitty.

His most notable contribution at the studio was Fat Albert and the Cosby Kids. Ryan wrote early episodes of the series as well as a Christmas special. While working on Fat Albert, Ryan's scripts were reviewed by a panel of teachers and psychologists to ensure there was educational content.

Ryan supervised stories for Hanna-Barbera's Casper and the Angels. While with the studio, he wrote the 1988 film Scooby-Doo! and the Reluctant Werewolf. Other productions Ryan wrote for include Pound Puppies and Tom & Jerry Kids.

In 1996, Ryan wrote an article for The Los Angeles Times, discussing his difficulty finding writing work at 60 years old and critiquing commercialism in animation. His last script was an episode of Hey Arnold!.

Works 
His works include:
The Super 6: writer (1 episode)
The Pink Panther Show: story
Will the Real Jerry Lewis Please Sit Down: writer (1 episode)
Sabrina and the Groovie Goolies: writer (16 episodes)
Groovie Goolies: writer
Archie's TV Funnies: writer
Fat Albert and the Cosby Kids: writer (1 episode)
My Favorite Martians: writer
The U.S. of Archie: writer (16 episodes)
The Secret Lives of Waldo Kitty: writer
The New Adventures of Gilligan: writer (5 episodes)
Shazam!: writer (4 episodes)
Ark II: writer (1 episode)
The New Adventures of Batman: writer (1 episode)
The New Archie and Sabrina Hour: writer
Galaxy Goof-Ups: story
Buford and the Galloping Ghost: story
Yogi's Space Race: story (13 episodes)
The New Shmoo: story
Trollkins: story
The Kwicky Koala Show: writer
Space Stars: story
Shirt Tales: story (5 episodes)
Pink Panther and Sons: story
The New Scooby-Doo Mysteries: writer (2 episodes)
Paw Paws: story/writer (9 episodes)
Pound Puppies: writer (1 episode)
Scooby-Doo Meets the Boo Brothers: writer
The Brave Little Toaster: screen story
Scooby-Doo! and the Reluctant Werewolf: writer
A Pup Named Scooby-Doo: writer/teleplay (3 episodes)
Droopy: Master Detective: writer (7 episodes)
The Tom and Jerry Kids Show: writer (12 episodes)
The Cartoon Cartoon Show: writer (1 episode)
What a Cartoon!: writer (1 episode)
Hey Arnold!: writer (segment "Hookey")

References

External links

1936 births
2022 deaths
20th-century American screenwriters
American television writers
Filmation people
Hanna-Barbera people